Indira Davelba Murillo Alvarado (Tegucigalpa, April 7, 1969–Virginia, January 5, 2019) was a Honduran journalist, television producer, former basketball player and philanthropist.  Founder of TN5, the Spanish Information Network of Virginia (Sinova), and of the Fundación Amor.

Early life and education 

She was born in Tegucigalpa, where she lived in the El Bosque neighborhood, along with her parents Alfredo Murillo and Norma Alvarado, and was the youngest of eight siblings.  She attended primary school at the Escuela 14 de Julio, and her secondary studies at the Instituto Alfonso Guillén Zelaya, where at the same time she had a basketball school called "Indi del Bosque", where she taught the children of the neighborhood to play basketball.  Murillo graduated with a degree in journalism from the Universidad Nacional Autónoma de Honduras, and also obtained a master's degree in demography and development.

Basketball career 

As a basketball player, she was part of the Honduran women's basketball team, along with her sister, Norma Murillo.  In the National Team, Murillo represented Honduras in several international basketball competitions, including the fourth edition of the Central American Games and an international competition held in Nicaragua in 1987. She subsequently became a trainer of the Women's Basketball Team of Honduras.

Murillo played for four different teams in Honduras until her retirement in the 90s.

Journalist career 

As a journalist, Murillo began her career working for Radio Cadena de Noticias, and later for Televicentro, where she worked as a reporter and news anchor, and also founded the TN5 newscast.  Later, Murillo worked for the Inter-American Development Bank as a producer and developer of reports and research.  Finally she worked for Telemundo.

Philanthropy 

In 2005, Murillo founded the Fundación Amor with her family, a non-profit foundation that benefits orphaned children and women with HIV.

In 2009, she founded the Spanish Information Network of Virginia (Sinova), a non-profit organization to inform the Latino community of Virginia about news, give advice on the migration process to the United States for free among other services.  Murillo was the president until her death in 2019.

Personal life 

She obtained the American nationality during her residence in that country.  In 2014, she married Omar Nava, originally from Bolivia.

Death 

Murillo died on January 5, 2019, in the state of Virginia, at the age of 49.  She had liver cancer.

Awards and honours 

 She received the Prize for solidarity in 2014 from the Inter-American Development Bank for her altruistic work.
 She received an award from Unicef for a story about the Montaña de la Flor.
 She received a prize for part of the EFE, for its audiovisual production "The hope of despair", about a family affected by Hurricane Mitch.

References

External links 
 Content in this edit is translated from the existing Spanish Wikipedia article at Indira Murillo; see its history for attribution.

People with acquired American citizenship
Honduran emigrants to the United States
Honduran sportswomen
Women's basketball players
People from Tegucigalpa
21st-century American women writers
American women journalists
Deaths from cancer in Virginia
1969 births
2019 deaths
20th-century philanthropists
20th-century women philanthropists